John Wesley Forbes II (born August 24, 1956) is an American government official who served as Virginia Secretary of Finance in the cabinet of Republican Jim Gilmore. He was sentenced to 10 years in federal prison in 2010 for embezzling from the Virginia Tobacco Indemnification and Community Revitalization Commission.

References

External links

1956 births
Living people
State cabinet secretaries of Virginia
Virginia Republicans
Politicians from Norfolk, Virginia
Virginia politicians convicted of crimes
Prisoners and detainees of the United States federal government